Sympistis franclemonti is a species of moth in the family Noctuidae (the owlet moths).

The MONA or Hodges number for Sympistis franclemonti is 10042.

References

Further reading

 
 
 

franclemonti
Articles created by Qbugbot
Moths described in 1968